The 1990 Texas gubernatorial election was held on November 6, 1990, to elect the governor of Texas. Incumbent Republican Governor Bill Clements did not run for re-election, so the election pitted Democrat Ann Richards against Republican Clayton Williams. Richards narrowly defeated Williams on Election Day, winning 49.5% of the vote to Williams' 46.9%. As of 2023, this is the last time a Democrat, and a woman, was elected Governor of Texas.

, this is the most recent gubernatorial election in Texas in which both major parties' gubernatorial nominees are deceased.

Primaries

Republican

Candidates 

 Clayton Williams, Businessman
 Kent Hance, Railroad Commissioner, Former U.S. Representative and candidate in 1986
 Tom Luce, Lawyer
 Jack Rains, Businessman
 W.N. Otwell
 Royce Owens
 Ed Cude

|}

Democratic

Candidates 

 Ann Richards, State Treasurer
 Jim Mattox, Attorney General, and former U.S. Representative
 Mark White, Former Governor
 Theresa Hearn-Haynes
 Earl Holmes
 Stanley Adams
 Ray Rachal

|}

|}

Campaign
Midland businessman Clayton Williams handily won the Republican primary.  Williams's vote total exceeded that of his nearest challenger, former Congressman and soon-to-be-former Railroad Commissioner Kent Hance by more than 45 percentage points.  T. Boone Pickens, CEO of Amarillo's Mesa Petroleum, was considered a likely candidate for much of 1989. However, on August 30, 1989, Pickens announced at a luncheon in Dallas that he would not run for the governorship in 1990. But Pickens, who also announced he would be relocating from Amarillo to Dallas, said he would consider a run for the governorship in 1994.

George W. Bush, who had just become part owner of the Texas Rangers baseball club, also declined to run for governor after briefly exploring a run for the governorship in 1990.  He did so on the advice of his mother.

Meanwhile, Democrat Ann Richards placed first in a six-person primary that included Texas Attorney General Jim Mattox and former governor Mark White, the latter of whom sought to return to the governor's mansion four years after losing his bid to remain Governor of Texas.

Williams spent freely from his personal fortune, running a "Good Old Boy" campaign initially appealing to conservatives. Prior to a series of gaffes, he was leading Richards (the race was dubbed "Claytie vs. The Lady") in the polls and was in striking distance of becoming only the second Republican governor of Texas since Reconstruction.  Meanwhile, Libertarian nominee Jeff Daiell was launching a TV campaign which, combined with personal appearances across Texas, boosted him to a showing of 129,128 votes.   His drawing power made Richards the first Texas governor in many years elected without a majority.

In one of his widely publicized missteps, Williams refused to shake hands with Ann Richards in a public debate, an act seen as uncouth. Earlier, Williams made an infamous joke to reporters, likening bad weather to rape, having quipped: "If it's inevitable, just relax and enjoy it". In addition, it has been claimed that as an undergraduate at Texas A&M, he had participated in visits to the Chicken Ranch, a well-known Texas brothel in La Grange, and the Boy's Towns of Mexico. As a result of his reported comments, Williams was occasionally parodied, such as in the mock political ad, "Satan Williams", which appeared on Dallas/Fort Worth public television during the 1990 campaign season. Richards was sworn-in as the 45th Governor of Texas on January 15, 1991.

Results

External links

Videos
 Former Governor Mark White's Campaign Commercial in the Democratic Primary for Governor from November 27, 1989 "Heroes & Do Right"

 Treasurer Ann Richards' Negative Attack Commercial "Mattox & White: The Worst Resumes Money Can Buy" from March 9, 1990

 Campaign Commercial "Ann" from February 28, 1990

 Campaign Commercial "Photos, Children, Drugs, Banking" from January 31, 1990

 White for Governor Commercial from January 26, 1990

 Campaign Commercial from November 5, 1989 "Achievements"

 Campaign Commercial from March 3, 1990 "Banks 1 & 2"

 Campaign Commercial by the Sheinkopf Agency

 Campaign Commercial "First City Texas" from January 22, 1990

 Campaign Commercial from November 27, 1989 "Heroes"

 Primary Gubernatorial Debate from January 7, 1990 at the George R. Brown Convention Center in Houston

 Primary Gubernatorial Debate from March 2, 1990 at KERA-TV Studios

 Negative Attack Ad "Politics as Usual"

 Attorney General Jim Mattox interviewed by Robert Riggs of WFAA-TV Dallas/Fort Worth on March 13, 1990

 Campaign Commercial "Clayton Williams in His Own Words"

References

1990
Gubernatorial
Texas